Denise Michelle Crosby (born November 24, 1957) is an American actress and model known for portraying Security Chief Tasha Yar mainly in season one of Star Trek: The Next Generation, and Yar's daughter, the half-Romulan Commander Sela, in subsequent seasons. She is also known for her numerous film and television roles, and for starring in and producing the film Trekkies.

Early life
Denise Michelle Crosby was born in Hollywood, California, the daughter of Marilyn Scott and actor Dennis Crosby, after whom she was named. Crosby's paternal grandfather was the famed singer and actor Bing Crosby. Crosby was born out of wedlock, and Crosby's parents went through a highly publicized, three-year-long lawsuit her father had brought to cancel the $80 per week he was paying Crosby's mother for child support. Crosby's mother won the lawsuit and Dennis was ordered to continue paying child support and legal fees. The lawsuit deeply embarrassed Dennis and Bing Crosby, whom Crosby never met even though she was 19 when he died.

Crosby graduated in 1975 from Hollywood High School, followed by Cabrillo College, where she studied theater. She dropped out of college after she was interviewed by a local paper and revealed her famous family background "One of the drama teachers used the story to illustrate to the class that this crap is what Hollywood's all about, using people's names to get somewhere. I was very, very hurt by it. So I just checked out." She started modeling and, in 1979, posed nude for the March issue of Playboy magazine, which she called "some kind of rebellion on my part, some way of saying screw you to the family image".

Career
Crosby's choice of career solidified at an early age and was influenced by her grandfather Bing Crosby and her father Dennis Crosby. Crosby's first high-profile role was as Lisa Davis on the soap opera Days of Our Lives. She has appeared as Dr. Gretchen Kelly in three episodes of Lois & Clark: The New Adventures of Superman, and as a sheriff on The Adventures of Brisco County, Jr. episode "No Man's Land". 

In the early 1990s, she played the role of the mayor in the short-lived series Key West. She also appeared in two episodes of the cable television series Red Shoe Diaries, playing a different character in each episode. Crosby had a small recurring role in Aaron Spelling's primetime drama, Models Inc, a spin-off from Melrose Place. She was a guest star on the eighth season of The X-Files for two episodes, in which she plays a doctor who examined Agent Scully's baby. In 1991, she was a guest star in "The Deadly Nightshade", a first-season The Flash episode as Dr. Rebecca Frost. 

In 2001, Crosby appeared in two episodes of	NYPD Blue as the abrasive Lieutenant Susan Dalto.  In 2006, she was a guest star in "Popping Cherry", the third episode of the first season of Dexter, appearing via flashback as the victim of Dexter's first serial killing. Crosby had a recurring role in Southland as Detective Dan "Sal" Salinger's wife.

One of her first film appearances was in the 1982 Nick Nolte/Eddie Murphy film 48 Hrs. This was followed by a small role in the 1982 film Trail of the Pink Panther, which she reprised in the sequel Curse of the Pink Panther. In 1985, Crosby appeared in the music video for the Chris Isaak song "Dancin'". In 1986, she appeared in the music video for Black Sabbath's song "No Stranger to Love". In the same year, she played a robotics engineer, Nora Hunter, in the science-fiction movie Eliminators. She starred in Stephen King's Pet Sematary, played the lead role in Dolly Dearest in 1991, and also appeared in Deep Impact and Quentin Tarantino's Jackie Brown. Her other film roles included the 2002 Western horror film Legend of the Phantom Rider, and the 2005 Tobe Hooper horror film Mortuary.

Star Trek

In 1987, Crosby was cast in the role of Tasha Yar for the much-publicized return of Star Trek to television in the syndicated series Star Trek: The Next Generation. She had been chosen to play Counselor Deanna Troi before Gene Roddenberry switched the roles that  Marina Sirtis and she had originally been given. Initially one of the top-billed characters and featured prominently in episodes such as "The Naked Now" and "Code of Honor", the role of Tasha gradually moved into the background as other members of the ensemble cast became a greater focus of the series.  Crosby reportedly grew disillusioned with her role because of its "Uhura-like" status: "I was struggling with not being able to do much with the character. I had all these ideas and couldn't do them. I was just stage dressing." Ultimately, Crosby decided to leave the show. Her character was killed by the alien creature Armus during the episode "Skin of Evil". She had appeared in 22 episodes when she left.

In later years, Crosby approached the TNG production team with the idea of reprising her role of Tasha Yar. This came to be in season-three's "Yesterday's Enterprise", in which an alternate timeline is created after the USS Enterprise-C, the predecessor to TNG's USS Enterprise-D, comes forward 22 years in time, just before it was to be destroyed. Yar joined the Enterprise-C before it returned to its own time to restore the original timeline. During the documentary Trekkies, Crosby commented that her Tasha Yar character had to die to get "the best episodes".

Crosby also guest-starred in several other TNG episodes, including "Redemption" and "Unification" as Romulan Commander Sela, the half-human, half-Romulan daughter of Tasha Yar, who had been taken prisoner in the past while on board the Enterprise-C. Crosby later reprised the role in the Star Trek: Armada video game, and again in the series finale, "All Good Things...", in which Captain Picard is moving back and forth through time, and encounters Tasha during the events just prior to the pilot episode.

Crosby co-produced and narrated the 1997 documentary Trekkies, followed by the 2003 sequel Trekkies 2. Both films star Crosby, who conducts interviews with devotees of Star Trek, more commonly known as "Trekkies". , she was reportedly working on a sequel called Trekkies 3.

Along with other Star Trek actors, she has also appeared in the "Blood and Fire" episode of the fan-produced series Star Trek: New Voyages, playing Dr. Jenna Yar (grandmother of Natasha Yar).

In 2013, Crosby provided voicing for the characters of Tasha Yar and Sela in the Cryptic Studios MMORPG Star Trek Online. Crosby became the first of a new wave of several Star Trek alumni to return to the roles they originated since Leonard Nimoy's participation at the game's launch in 2010.

Post-Star Trek work
In January and February 2010, Crosby performed alongside Gale Harold and ex-model Claudia Mason in Tennessee Williams' Orpheus Descending at Theater in Los Angeles. The production and cast received mostly positive reviews in the Los Angeles Times, which stated, "Harold, ideally cast, beautifully ignites with Crosby, whose unconventional interpretation is an affecting revelation."

Crosby has a recurring role on Showtime's 2013 series Ray Donovan. In 2014, she appeared in three episodes of AMC's The Walking Dead as Mary, a member of a group of cannibals. The character first appears in the penultimate episode of season four, "Us", and made her final appearance in the season-five premiere, "No Sanctuary".

Crosby also played the role of widow Margie Curtis in the TV series Bones, season three, episode four, "The Secret in the Soil". She played the role of Special Master Faye Richardson in the legal drama Suits in its final season.

Personal life
Crosby was married to Geoffrey Edwards, son of director Blake Edwards, from 1983 to 1990. She appeared in a number of her former father-in-law's films, including 10, Skin Deep, Trail of the Pink Panther, and Curse of the Pink Panther. Crosby married Ken Sylk in 1995, and they have a son born in 1998.

Filmography

Film

Television

Producer

Video games

References

External links

Bing Crosby
20th-century American actresses
21st-century American actresses
Actresses from Hollywood, Los Angeles
American film actresses
American soap opera actresses
American television actresses
Cabrillo College alumni
Living people
Year of birth missing (living people)